Paraona staudingeri is a moth of the family Erebidae first described by Sergei Alphéraky in 1897. It is found in the Russian Far East, China, Korea, Japan and Taiwan.

The wingspan is about 35–50 mm. Adults are on wing in May.

Subspecies
Paraona staudingeri staudingeri
Paraona staudingeri formosana Okano, 1960 (Taiwan)

References

Moths described in 1897
Lithosiina
Moths of Japan